The 1987 Carling Challenge was a non-ranking snooker tournament, which took place between 14 and 16 September 1987. The tournament featured four professional players and was filmed in RTÉ Studios, Dublin, for broadcast on RTÉ.

Dennis Taylor won the tournament for the second consecutive season defeating Joe Johnson 8–5.


Main draw
Results are shown below.

References

Fosters Professional
Carlsberg Challenge
Carlsberg Challenge
Carlsberg Challenge